Don Quixote is Canadian singer Gordon Lightfoot's 8th original album, released in 1972 on the Reprise Records Label.  The album reached #42 on the Billboard album chart.

The album contains little innovation on Lightfoot's trademark folk sound, although it is notable for containing Lightfoot's third and fourth seafaring songs, "Christian Island (Georgian Bay)" and Ode to Big Blue (his first two being "Marie Christine" from Back Here on Earth and "Ballad of Yarmouth Castle" from Sunday Concert). Lightfoot would continually revisit nautical themes over the next ten years. Don Quixote also contains a rare Lightfoot foray into the protest song genre in the form of the longest track on the album, "The Patriot's Dream", a ballad describing the enthusiasm of soldiers on a troop train "riding off to glory in the spring of their years", followed by the pathos of a woman receiving news that her husband's aircraft had been shot down in combat. The title track is a lyrical paean to Cervantes’ half-mad hero.

"Beautiful" was released as a single and peaked at #58 on the Billboard singles chart.

On February 13, 1988, Lightfoot performed "Alberta Bound" in McMahon Stadium during the Opening Ceremonies for the 1988 Winter Olympics held in Calgary, Alberta.

Track listing
All compositions by Gordon except as indicated.
Gordon was 34 at the time of the release

Side 1
"Don Quixote" – 3:41
"Christian Island (Georgian Bay)" – 4:02
"Alberta Bound" – 3:07
"Looking at the Rain" – 3:40
"Ordinary Man" – 3:19
"Brave Mountaineers" – 3:36

Side 2
"Ode to Big Blue" – 4:48
"Second Cup of Coffee" – 3:03
"Beautiful" – 3:23
"On Susan's Floor" (Shel Silverstein, Vince Matthews) – 2:58
"The Patriot's Dream" – 6:04

Personnel 
 Gordon Lightfoot - 6- & 12-string guitar
 Red Shea - hi-string guitar, classical guitar, dobro
 Terry Clements - lead acoustic guitar
 Rick Haynes - bass
 Ry Cooder - mandolin
 Bob Thompson - string arrangements "Don Quixote" and "The Patriot's Dream"
 Nick DeCaro - all other string arrangements

Chart positions

References

External links
Album lyrics and chords

Gordon Lightfoot albums
1972 albums
Albums produced by Lenny Waronker
Reprise Records albums